Rani Aur Lalpari is a 1975 Indian Hindi-language children's fantasy film directed by Ravikant Nagaich and produced by Hari Prasad Nagaich and Rani Nagaich of Guru Enterprising Movies. The film stars Baby Raani in the lead role with an ensemble including Reena Roy, Rajendra Kumar, Asha Parekh, Jeetendra, Feroz Khan, and Neetu Singh. The music was composed by Vasant Desai.

Plot
Rani is a child who is being brought up by her mother, Kamla (Asha Parekh) as her dad Rajendra (Rajendra Kumar) has gone out of town on business. Both mother and daughter live with their cruel and selfish relatives (Satyen Kappu  and Lalita Kumari). They live with her abusive uncle. One day, Kamla gets the news that her husband is returning, and she is overjoyed. This joy turns to sorrow when she finds out that he has died in an accident. Shortly thereafter, she too passes away, leaving poor Rani at the hands of the cruel relatives. Her best friend Pappu (Master Abbas) tells her about Lalpari (Reena Roy). She succeeds to reach heaven with the help of Lalpari and manages to trick Yamraj (God of truth and death). However, Rani's father was only injured in the plane crash. Rani lives happily ever after with her parents. This movie also features the story of Cinderella and Gulliver's Travels in two songs.

Cast

Rajendra Kumar as Rajendra, Rani's dad
Asha Parekh as Kamla, Rani's mom
Jeetendra as Prince Charming
Feroz Khan as Gulliver
Neetu Singh as Cinderella 
Reena Roy as Lalpari  
Master Abbas as Pappu  
Baby Raani as Raani
Satyen Kappu as Ramlal, Raani's uncle
Lalita Kumari as Ramlal's wife
Ramesh Deo as Pappu's father 
Seema Deo as Pappu's mother 
Agha as Cinderella's dad 
Rajee Singh as Cinderella's mother 
Preeti Ganguli as Cinderella's step-mom 
Prem Nath as Yamraj
Jagdeep as Chitra Gupt
Raja Babu as King of Lilliput
Aruna Irani as Menaka   
Leena Das
Jankidas   
Padma Khanna as Mermaid
Manju Bhargavi as Apsara 
Mahipal  
Narendra Nath   
Danny Denzongpa as himself.

Soundtrack

References

External links
 

1975 films
1970s Hindi-language films
1970s children's fantasy films
1970s musical fantasy films
Indian children's fantasy films
Indian musical fantasy films
Films based on Cinderella
Films based on Gulliver's Travels
Films directed by Ravikant Nagaich